Thonburi City Football Club, is a Thai professional football club based in Thonburi, Bangkok. The club was founded in 2013. They currently play in 2018 Thailand Amateur League Western Region.

History 
Thonburi City was established in 2014 as a 'pilot club' to replace Laem Chabang F.C., which was ended at the last place of the previous season of Bangkok and field region. The club started its first season at the Central & Western Region, where is the same region with their regional rival Krung Thonburi F.C. 'King Cobra' used Thonburi Stadium as its temporary home ground due to 84th Birthday Anniversary of His Majesty the King Sport Club was still under maintenance. King Cobra ended their first season with the 8th place of the region with 33 points, edged the ninth-placed Krung Thonburi F.C. which had the same number of obtained points by Head-to-Head results.

In 2015, King Cobra got its first achievement as it won the second place of the Central & Western Region and qualified to the Champions League Group stage. However, the club ended their season at the sixth place, and they failed to qualify to the 2016 Division 1.

In 2016, King Cobra moved to 84th Birthday Anniversary of His Majesty the King Sport Club first season and affiliated with Port F.C., but King Cobra started their season with a 0–5 thrashed to regional rival in first match of the league. Then, King Cobra made their bad performance till they ended up at the last place of Western region and relegated to Thai Football Division 3 next season.

In 2017, Thonburi City played in 2016 Thai Division 3 Tournament Central Region and failed in Third round.

In 2018, Thonburi City played in 2018 Thailand Amateur League Western Region.

Stadium and locations

Season By Season record

References

 Thonburi City news
 http://www.thailive.net/2016/08/22/%E0%B8%A3%E0%B9%88%E0%B8%A7%E0%B8%87%E0%B8%AD%E0%B8%B5%E0%B8%812-%E0%B8%99%E0%B8%84%E0%B8%A3%E0%B8%A8%E0%B8%A3%E0%B8%B5-%E0%B8%98%E0%B8%99%E0%B8%9A%E0%B8%B8%E0%B8%A3%E0%B8%B5-%E0%B8%95%E0%B8%81/
 https://www.thairath.co.th/content/571816
 http://www.supersubthailand.com/news/2321-10/index.html#sthash.qhnxQt27.dpbs

External links
 Official Facebookpage of Thonburi City FC
 Thonburi City Fanclub

Association football clubs established in 2013
Football clubs in Thailand
Pathum Thani province
2013 establishments in Thailand